Marcus Johansson (born 24 August 1993) is a Swedish footballer who currently plays for ÍA in Iceland.

Career

Silkeborg IF
Johansson left Silkeborg IF at the end of 2018.

References

External links 
 

Swedish footballers
Allsvenskan players
Superettan players
1993 births
Living people
Halmstads BK players
Östers IF players
Jönköpings Södra IF players
Silkeborg IF players
Marcus Johansson
Association football defenders